Michael Martyn or Mick Martyn may refer to:

Mick Martyn (Australian footballer) (born 1968), AFL footballer
Mick Martyn (rugby league) (1936–2017), British rugby league footballer

See also
Michael Martin (disambiguation)
Mick Martin (born 1951), Irish footballer